Ashwamedh (Gujarati: અશ્વમેધ) is a Gujarati language three-act play written by Chinu Modi. It has endured some controversy due to its bold and taboo theme. However, it is considered one of the finest works of Modi by several critics.

Plot 
Mohini, the main character of the play, is the wife of King Vichitrasen. She experienced sexual orgasm at the age of 16 while riding a horse. The rituals of Ashvamedha yajna demand that once the king becomes Chakravarti (undisputed sovereign), the chief queen must have sexual intercourse with the horse. 

In accordance with this ritual, Mohini suggests that her husband organizes Ashvamedha yajna at the beginning of the play. She tells the king that her wish is to see him as a Chakravarti king, but her main desire lies in having sex with the horse. For the purpose of the yajna, she chooses a horse named Bijak from the royal stable. As the yajna starts, she displays blind sexual attraction towards the horse. At the end of the yajna, when she approaches the horse for the ritualistic sex, she finds that Bijak is exhausted from running for a whole year and has lost the charm it had earlier. She refuses to recognize the horse. Due to the unfulfilled sexual desire and her resulting anger, she commits suicide on the spot with a sword. Her suicide tragically concludes the play.

In the play, Chinu Modi vividly described the crisis in the life of King Vichitrasen and the soldiers who went for the yajna. Modi has used chorus to signify a situation in the play.

References

External links 
 

Gujarati-language books
Indian plays
1986 plays
Gujarati-language plays
Sexuality in plays
Zoophilia in culture